Wekweètì Airport , formerly known as Snare Lake Airport, is located  east of Wekweeti, Northwest Territories, Canada.

Airlines and destinations

References

Certified airports in the North Slave Region